Agdistis iranica is a moth in the family Pterophoridae. It is known from Iran.

References

Agdistinae
Moths of the Middle East
Moths described in 2006